Wolney Queiroz Maciel (born 12 December 1972) is a Brazilian businessman and politician from the Democratic Labour Party. He has been Opposition Leader in the Chamber of Deputies since 16 February 2022.

References 

1972 births
Living people
21st-century Brazilian businesspeople
21st-century Brazilian politicians
Democratic Labour Party (Brazil) politicians

Members of the Chamber of Deputies (Brazil) from Pernambuco
Members of the Chamber of Deputies (Brazil)
Opposition leaders